The Carmichaels Covered Bridge is a historic wooden covered bridge located at Carmichaels in Greene County, Pennsylvania. It crosses Muddy Creek. As of October 1978, it was one of nine historic covered bridges in Greene County.

It was listed on the National Register of Historic Places in 1979.

See also 

 List of bridges on the National Register of Historic Places in Pennsylvania
 National Register of Historic Places listings in Greene County, Pennsylvania

References 

Covered bridges on the National Register of Historic Places in Pennsylvania
Bridges in Greene County, Pennsylvania
Tourist attractions in Greene County, Pennsylvania
Covered bridges in Greene County, Pennsylvania
Bridges completed in 1889
National Register of Historic Places in Greene County, Pennsylvania
Road bridges on the National Register of Historic Places in Pennsylvania
Wooden bridges in Pennsylvania
Queen post truss bridges in the United States